Kim Danila Shillinglaw (born 1969) is a British media executive. A former controller of BBC Two and BBC Four, head of science and natural history commissioning at the BBC, and commissioner for children's entertainment at CBBC, she later became director of factual programming at Endemol Shine UK,

Early life and career
Born in London, Shillinglaw spent her early years in Cameroon and Spain, countries in which her parents worked during the 1970s.

After her family's return to Britain, she attended Holland Park Comprehensive and then read history at Wadham College, Oxford. After her graduation, she worked in strategy and the music industry then joined Observer Films (for a time part of the Guardian Media Group) as a researcher, eventually becoming a series producer. Following this, she worked for ITV and Channel 4.

BBC posts
From 2006, Shillinglaw worked as an executive producer for BBC Factual and the commissioner of independent productions for CBBC. Among shows that she developed and commissioned at CBBC was the Horrible Histories series. Shillinglaw was responsible for changing the original pitch, a long-form drama idea about a ghost train, into a comedy proposal based on sketches with contemporary references to popular culture. She also requested the recruitment of adult comedy writers. Working under Karen O'Connor from late 2007, she then became one of 10 "creative leads" in London Factual.

From May 2009, she was the BBC's commissioning editor and head of commissioning for science and natural history, responsible around 2012 for 200 hours of programming per year. In 2010, she organised the BBC's Year of Science and The Times first Eureka issue included Shillinglaw in its list of the top 100 influential people in British science, observing her role in promoting more female presenters and experts on screen, as well as introducing Brian Cox to television. She is reported as having tweeted: "Why are only women on Mock the Week compilations laughing cutaways? They never get to speak. Surely not because not funny?" In a 2011 article for The Guardian, she argued television had not done enough to include women onscreen. Shillinglaw brought more diversity to screen, including Helen Czerski, Gabrielle Weston, Maggie Aderin-Pocock, Hannah Fry, and Saleyha Asan, among others. In 2012, Broadcast magazine's Hot 100 described her as "about as far from the stereotype of a BBC commissioner as you can get: enthusiastic, uncensored and jargon free". She expanded the range of science subjects on TV, and commissioned more popular programmes including Stargazing Live, which for its second series won its slot against drama on BBC1, Wonders of the Universe, Trust Me I'm a Doctor, Supermarket Secrets and Bang Goes the Theory. The proportion of science-themed broadcasting on BBC One is reported to have risen during Shillinglaw's period in charge of the department.

She assumed her posts as controller of both BBC Two and BBC Four in April 2014, in succession to Janice Hadlow at a time when critics were reported as saying "certain things are rather tired about it now", calling for a "boot up the rear" and pointing to ageing audiences. During her period as the 13th (and final) controller of BBC Two, On 9 January 2015, Shillinglaw told Broadcast magazine that "BBC2 is a fundamentally grown-up channel but should be young at heart". According to the television producer contacts of journalist George Monbiot, she was less keen to commission programmes on environmental issues. Shillinglaw commissioned programmes such as the comedy Mum, Exodus, Muslims Like Us, The Real Marigold Hotel, which eventually moved to BBC One due to its high ratings, introduced the first female presenter of a TV Comedy Panel Show, QI, the first non-white presenter of the RI Christmas Lectures and brought women's football into prime-time.

In January 2016, it was announced the posts of BBC One, BBC Two and BBC Four controllers were being abolished in a re-structure by the BBC's director general Tony Hall. At the same time, it became known Shillinglaw was leaving the BBC; however, according to The Guardian it was intended that she would work through her six-month notice period.

Later career
In August 2016, she was appointed as the first director of factual programming at Endemol Shine UK. Shillinglaw executed substantial restructuring including hiring new managing directors for several companies, merging or rebranding other businesses and opening new offices in Belfast and Leeds. Over three years, she tripled turnover and substantially increased profitability, before exiting on the successful sale of EndemolShine to Banijay.

Shillinglaw is a non-executive director at Natural England, at Ofcom, the Natural Environment Research Council, and Raspberry Pi.

Personal life
She is married to the television producer Steve Condie, who has worked on Newsnight. The couple live in west London and have two children.

References

|-

1969 births
Living people
Alumni of Wadham College, Oxford
BBC executives
BBC Four controllers
BBC Two controllers